John Christian "Jack" Ruckelshaus II (January 4, 1930 – May 22, 2015) was an American lawyer and politician.

Biography
Ruckelshaus was born in Indianapolis, Indiana, where he attended Park Tudor School. Ruckelshaus served in the United States Army in 1952 and 1953. He graduated from the University of Notre Dame in 1953 and the Indiana University Robert H. McKinney School of Law in 1957. Ruckelshaus was admitted to the Indiana State Bar in 1957 and practiced law in Indianapolis. Ruckelshaus served in the Indiana Senate from 1957 to 1964 as a Republican. He then served on the Indianapolis School Board from 1964 to 1968 and the Indianapolis City-County Council from 1971 to 1975. His brother was William Ruckelshaus, who served as United States Deputy Attorney General and two-time Administrator of the Environmental Protection Agency. His son is John Ruckelshaus, a former member of the Indiana Senate.

Notes

External links

1930 births
2015 deaths
Politicians from Indianapolis
Military personnel from Indiana
University of Notre Dame alumni
Indiana University alumni
Indiana lawyers
School board members in Indiana
Indianapolis City-County Council members
Republican Party Indiana state senators
20th-century American lawyers